Nobody's Daughter is a Hungarian film released 4 March 1976. Based on a book by Zsigmond Móricz, the film tells the story of Csöre, an orphan girl living among the peasantry of Hungary in the 1930s. It stars Zsuzsa Czinkóczi, then age seven, as main character Csöre, also known as Árvácska. Árvácska means literally "little orphan" and it's also the Hungarian name of the violet flower. 

The film was released in the United States under the title Nobody's Daughter.

Cast
Zsuzsa Czinkóczi as Csöre
Anna Nagy as Kedvesanyám, Csöre's first stepmother
Sándor Horváth as Kedvesapám, Csöre's first stepfather
Marianna Moór as Zsabamári, Csöre's second stepmother
Ila Schütz as Zsofka
Ádám Szirtes as Szennyes József
Flóra Kádár as wife
József Madaras as Kadaros István
Piroska Molnár as Anna
László Szacsvay as Fáradtarcú

External links 
 

Hungarian drama films
1970s Hungarian-language films
1976 films
Films directed by László Ranódy
Films about orphans
1976 drama films